Riccardoella is a genus of mites belonging to the family Ereynetidae.

The species of this genus are found in Europe and Northern America.

Species:

Riccardoella canadensis 
Riccardoella limacum 
Riccardoella novaezealandiae 
Riccardoella oudemansi 
Riccardoella reaumuri 
Riccardoella tokyoensis

References

Acari